The 1st constituency of Saint Barthélemy and Saint-Martin is a French legislative constituency covering the two overseas collectivities of Saint Barthélemy and Saint Martin.

Deputies

Election results

2022

* LR dissident

2017

 
 
 
 
 

°

2012

References

Sources
 Official results of French elections: 

French legislative constituencies
Politics of Saint Barthélemy
Saint Martin (island)